Gornje Točane is a village in the municipality of Kuršumlija, Serbia. According to the 2002 census, the village had a population of 18 people. However, according to the 2011 census, the village has a population of 13, 9 of which are 65 years or more of age.

References

Populated places in Toplica District